Jonathan Rodriguez may refer to:

 Jonathan Rodriguez (basketball) (born 1987), Puerto Rican basketball player
 Jonathan Pereira (footballer) (born 1987), Spanish footballer
 Jony López (Jonathan López Rodríguez, born 1987), Spanish footballer
 Jonathan Rodríguez (footballer, born 1993), Uruguayan footballer
 Jonathan Joel Rodríguez (born 1994), Argentine footballer
 Jonathan Rodríguez (footballer, born 1990) (born 1990), Argentine footballer
 Johnny Rodriguez (soccer) (born 1998), American soccer player